Grant McDougall (October 12, 1910 – December 9, 1958) was an American athlete. He competed in the men's hammer throw at the 1932 Summer Olympics.

He was the grandson of ship designer Alexander McDougall.

References

1910 births
1958 deaths
Athletes (track and field) at the 1932 Summer Olympics
American male hammer throwers
Olympic track and field athletes of the United States
Place of birth missing